Cork College of Commerce is a college that was established in December 1908 in Cork, Ireland.  It was originally named the "School of Commerce and Domestic Science".

Purpose
Since 1991, when the last of its secondary school students finished their Leaving Certificate examinations, the college changed its focus, running both full-time day courses and a night school. Today, the college offers hundreds of courses across a range of topics including computing, business studies, office administration, applied languages, health studies, beauty therapy, complementary therapy, childcare and Montessori, fashion, travel and tourism, adult Leaving Certificate and general interest courses. Many of the courses offered by the college result in a formal qualification, such as a qualification recognized by Accounting Technicians Ireland, or as a Certified Public Accountant.

Facilities & Services
The College of Commerce was refurbished in 1998 and has a canteen, library, computer resources, interview and language training labs. The college provides corporate training and room rental facilities, as well as career and work placement services.
In 2019 the College opened the West Cork Campus in Skibbereen.

External links
 Official Website

References

Educational institutions established in 1908
Education in Cork (city)
Further education colleges in County Cork
Buildings and structures in Cork (city)
1908 establishments in Ireland